The Straits of Mackinac Shipwreck Preserve is a  state preserve in and around the Straits of Mackinac.  The preserve is divided in two by the Mackinac Bridge.  The waters of the preserve include the waters offshore from Mackinaw City and St. Ignace, as well as all or part of the shorelines of Bois Blanc Island, Mackinac Island, Round Island, and St. Helena Island.

The preserve contains at least eleven identified wrecks. Frequent fog and congested shipping added to the count of shipwrecks in the Straits area. Half a dozen lighthouses in and around the preserve testify to the dangers that existed prior to the invention of radar in the 1940s. However, tragedies have continued.

Divers also visit underwater formations of Mackinac breccia near Mackinac Island; one such formation, the "Rock Maze", is offshore from Arch Rock.  Further east off Arch Rock, a drowned, -high waterfall formation, Mackinac Falls, was discovered in August 2007.

Known wrecks within the preserve

See also
 Michigan Underwater Preserves
 Old Mackinac Point Light
 Round Island Light (Michigan)
 St. Helena Island Light

References

Protected areas of Cheboygan County, Michigan
Protected areas of Emmet County, Michigan
Protected areas of Mackinac County, Michigan
Marine parks of Michigan
Lake Huron
Lake Michigan
Shipwreck discoveries by John Steele